Bhuvaneshwar Prasad Sinha of Shahabad (now Bhojpur), Bengal Presidency (1 February 1899 – 12 November 1986) was the 6th Chief Justice of India (1 October 1959 – 31 January 1964). He also served as the president of the Bharat Scouts and Guides from April 1965 to February 1967. Mr. Sinha was born and brought up in a prominent Hindu Kshatriya family of Rajwada Gajiyapur Estate, Sinha Arrah (present Bhojpur) District. His grandson B. P. Singh is a former judge of the Supreme Court of India.

Sinha served as the Chief Justice of the Supreme Court of India from 1 October 1959 to 31 January 1964.

A deeply religious man,  following his retirement, Sinha led a quiet life mostly devoted to spiritual pursuits, though he did accept a number of private arbitration cases. Becoming blind in his later years, he died in 1986.

Career 
He was educated at the Arrah Zilla School, Patna College and Patna Law College.

Sinha topped the list of candidates at the B.A. (Hons) in 1919 and M.A in 1921 at the Patna University. He was a Vakil in the Patna High Court from 1922to 1927. Later he became an advocate in 1927 and also got the position of Lecturer at the Govt. Law College, Patna, both of which he remained till 1935. He also was a member of the Senate of the Faculty of Law and of the Board of Examiners in Law, Patna Univ. He became the member of the Court of the Benaras Hindu University where he was a Government Pleader from 1935 to 1939. He was Srimati Radhika Sinha Gold Medalist for standing first in History.

He became an Assistant Govt. Advocate in 1940 and the Judge of Patna High Court in 1943. He was elevated to the position of the Chief Justice of Nagpur High Court in 1951 and eventually to the Judge of Supreme Court in December 1954 at which he remained till September 30 1959. 
He finally became the Chief Justice of India in 1959 and remained so till 1964 and then he retired.

Published works
 Reminiscences and Reflections of a Chief Justice , 1985, 1st ed.

References

 Supreme Court of India, Biographies

1899 births
1986 deaths
Chief justices of India
Scouting and Guiding in India
Patna University alumni
People from Patna
Judges of the Patna High Court
Chief Justices of the Madhya Pradesh High Court
20th-century Indian judges
20th-century Indian lawyers